is a scallop-shaped Kofun period burial mound located in what is now the Kashima neighborhood of the city of Ōta, Gunma Prefecture in the northern Kantō region of Japan. The site was designated a National Historic Site of Japan in 1927. It is the third largest scallop-shaped kofun (帆立貝形古墳) in Japan after the Otomeyama Kofun in Nara Prefecture (128.3 meters) and the Osabotsuka Kofun in Miyazaki Prefecture (175 meters)

Overview
The Nyotaizan Kofun is located on a small plateau south of the Kanayama hills. It is part of a group of tumuli which includes the Ōta Tenjinyama Kofun. Its main dimensions are:

Overall length: 106 meters
Posterior circle: 84 meter diameter by 7 meters high
Anterior width: 18 meters by 1 meter high 

The tumulus is covered in fukiishi and is surrounded by a moat with a width varying from 11 to 19 meters. Numerous cylindrical haniwa have also been found. The burial chamber was accessed from above, and was pillaged in ancient times; however, the tumulus has not been excavated. From the style, it is estimated that this tumulus dates from the middle of the fifth century AD. It is slightly older than the neighboring Ōta Tenjinyama Kofun, but shares the same orientation, so the two tumuli must be related. 

The tumulus is about a 20 minutes walk from Ōta Station on the Tōbu Isesaki Line.

See also
List of Historic Sites of Japan (Gunma)

References

External links
 
Ōta City official site 

Kofun
History of Gunma Prefecture
Ōta, Gunma
Archaeological sites in Japan
Historic Sites of Japan